Neeralakatti is a village in Dharwad district of Karnataka, India.

Demographics 
As of the 2011 Census of India there were 352 households in Neeralakatti and a total population of 1,964 consisting of 1,178 males and 786 females. There were 244 children ages 0-6.

References

Villages in Dharwad district